Dębiany may refer to the following places:
Dębiany, Kuyavian-Pomeranian Voivodeship (north-central Poland)
Dębiany, Jędrzejów County in Świętokrzyskie Voivodeship (south-central Poland)
Dębiany, Kazimierza County in Świętokrzyskie Voivodeship (south-central Poland)
Dębiany, Pińczów County in Świętokrzyskie Voivodeship (south-central Poland)
Dębiany, Sandomierz County in Świętokrzyskie Voivodeship (south-central Poland)
Dębiany, Bartoszyce County in Warmian-Masurian Voivodeship (north Poland)
Dębiany, Kętrzyn County in Warmian-Masurian Voivodeship (north Poland)